Gangala-na-bodio is a town in northeastern DR Congo. It was the site of the Gangala-na-Bodio Elephant Domestication Center during the colonial period.

Notes

Populated places in Haut-Uélé